Devon Kershaw (born December 20, 1982) is a Canadian retired cross-country skier who competed from 2005 to 2018. Growing up in Sudbury, Ontario, Canada, he split his time between several sports before choosing to focus on his cross-country ski career. His career highlights include placing second overall in the World Cup standing in 2011/2012 and claiming the World Champion title in 2011 at the World Ski Championships in Oslo, Norway in the men's team sprint with teammate Alex Harvey.

Early life and career
Kershaw grew up in the Northern Ontario city of Sudbury. His father, Will, and mother, Maureen, were instrumental in developing and nurturing a love of the natural environment and active lifestyle. Kershaw was a serious sports enthusiast growing up, playing hockey, volleyball, badminton, and tennis, and running competitively in his younger years.

Skiing for Laurentian Nordic as a young skier in Sudbury, he participated in three World Junior Championships (2000, 2001, 2002) and won 18 National Junior Medals. As a senior racer he moved west to Canmore, Alberta, home of Canada's National Ski Team, to pursue his athletic dreams and pursuits.

Athletic career
In the 2005 World Championships in Oberstdorf finished 14th in the individual sprint.

He was also the first Canadian male cross country skier to medal in the sprint category – placing third in the Freestyle Sprint in Borlänge, Sweden, on March 7, 2006. In November 2006, he skied his way into the history books again by placing a best finish for a Canadian male in more than 10 years in a World Cup event – 2nd in the Men's 15 kilometre classic race in Saariselkae, Finland.

During the first Tour de Ski in 2006–2007, Kershaw came 2nd in the first Stage – the Freestyle Sprint. Unfortunately, Kershaw became ill and was unable to finish the Tour.

In 2009, Kershaw and the Canadian team finish sixth in the 4 x 10 km relay in the Liberec World Championships, the highest placing ever for the Canadian Team.

In the Vancouver 2010 Winter Olympics, Kershaw's best individual finish was fifth in the 50 km event, and fourth in the team sprint with teammate Alex Harvey. This is the best placing ever for Canadian men in an Olympic cross-country competition.

In the 2011 tour de ski, Kershaw came in first in one of the sprint stages, beating Dario Cologna, and Petter Northug.
In the Oslo 2011 World Championship Kershaw and Harvey won the gold medal in the team sprint, bringing Canada their first ever gold and second World Championship medal ever, the first being Sara Renner's bronze in 2005.

In the 2012 Tour de Ski, Kershaw came in fourth place overall, the best a Canadian has ever done.

Kershaw had his best ever season in 2011/2012, finishing second overall in the World Cup standings. He was on the podium in six world cup podiums with two gold, one silver, and three bronze.

Cross-country skiing results
All results are sourced from the International Ski Federation (FIS).

Olympic Games

World Championships
 1 medal – (1 gold)

World Cup

Season standings

Individual podiums
 3 victories – (2 , 1 ) 
 14 podiums – (6 , 8 )

Team podiums

 1 podium – (1 )

Personal life
Kershaw is the eldest of three children, sister Linnaea is a journalism student in Vancouver and brother Sean an Art History student in Montreal. Beyond skiing Kershaw plans to return to school to pursue a degree in medicine, with the eventual goal of becoming doctor specializing in sports medicine.

He is married to Norwegian cross-country skier Kristin Størmer Steira, the two having been together since December 2012 and married since July 2015, and has one daughter, born in 2017.

References

External links
 
 
 
 Official Site
 Bio at Cross Country Canada

1982 births
Canadian male cross-country skiers
Cross-country skiers at the 2006 Winter Olympics
Cross-country skiers at the 2010 Winter Olympics
Cross-country skiers at the 2014 Winter Olympics
Cross-country skiers at the 2018 Winter Olympics
FIS Nordic World Ski Championships medalists in cross-country skiing
Tour de Ski skiers
Living people
Olympic cross-country skiers of Canada
Sportspeople from Greater Sudbury